The 1999 Western Illinois Leathernecks football team represented Western Illinois University as a member of the Gateway Football Conference during the 1999 NCAA Division I-AA football season. They were led by first-year head coach Don Patterson and played their home games at Hanson Field in Macomb, Illinois. The Leathernecks finished the season with a 7–4 record overall and a 2–4 record in conference play.

Schedule

References

Western Illinois
Western Illinois Leathernecks football seasons
Western Illinois Leathernecks football